Audun Brekke Fløtten (born 20 August 1990) is a Norwegian former road cyclist.

Major results

2016
2nd Fyen Rundt
2017
1st Fyen Rundt
2nd Himmerland Rundt
3rd Sundvolden GP
4th GP Horsens
5th Scandinavian Race Uppsala
5th Overall Tour of Rhodes
6th Ringerike GP
6th Skive–Løbet

References

1990 births
Living people
Norwegian male cyclists